Lalakhal is a tourist spot in Jaintiapur, Sylhet District, Bangladesh. 

Lalakhal is a wide channel in the Sharee River near the Tamabil road. The river is not very deep and is one of the sources of sand in Sylhet. The focal point of the feature is the variety of colours of the water, which varies from blue to green to clear at different points.

See also
 Ratargul Swamp Forest

References

Jaintiapur Upazila
Tourist attractions in Bangladesh